Louka may refer to:

Places

Czech Republic
 Louka (Hodonín District)
 Louka (Blansko District)
 Nová Louka
 Louka u Litvínova

Estonia
 Lõuka, village in Tõstamaa Parish, Pärnu County, in southwestern Estonia

Name

Given name
 Louka Katseli

Surname
 Loukas Louka (athlete) (born 1945), Cypriot shot putter.
 Loukas Louka (footballer) (born 1978), Cypriot footballer
 Liasos Louka (born 1980), Cypriot footballer
 Marios Louka (born 1982), Cypriot footballer
 Ilias Louka (born 1974), Cypriot shot putter
 Mikhalis Louka (born 1970), Cypriot shot putter